Be Good at It is the sixth studio album by American country music artist Neal McCoy. Released in late 1997 on Atlantic Records, it features the singles "If You Can't Be Good, Be Good at It"; "Party On"; "Love Happens Like That"; and "The Shake," which was reprised from McCoy's 1997 Greatest Hits compilation. Of these four singles, only "The Shake" reached Top Ten on the Billboard country charts. "21 to 17" was recorded (under the title "21-17") by Doug Supernaw on his 1999 album Fadin' Renegade.

Track listing

Personnel

 Eddie Bayers - drums
 Larry Byrom - acoustic guitar, electric guitar, gut string guitar, slide guitar
 Mark Casstevens - acoustic guitar
 Dusty Drake - background vocals
 Paul Franklin - steel guitar
 Sonny Garrish - steel guitar
 Aubrey Haynie - fiddle, mandolin
 Jason Lehning - organ
 Paul Leim - drums
 Chris Leuzinger - acoustic guitar, electric guitar
 Neal McCoy - lead vocals 
 Terry McMillan - harmonica, percussion
 Brent Mason - 12-string guitar, electric guitar
 Nashville String Machine - strings
 Steve Nathan - keyboards, Hammond organ, piano, Wurlitzer
 Donny Parenteau - fiddle
 Michael Rhodes - bass guitar
 Matt Rollings - Hammond organ, piano
 Brent Rowan - electric guitar
 Russell Terrell - background vocals
 Bergen White - string arrangements 
 Dennis Wilson - background vocals
 Curtis Wright - background vocals
 Curtis Young - background vocals

Charts

Weekly charts

Year-end charts

References

1997 albums
Atlantic Records albums
Neal McCoy albums
Albums produced by Kyle Lehning